Heineken N.V. is a Dutch multinational brewing company, founded in 1864 by Gerard Adriaan Heineken in Amsterdam. , Heineken owns over 165 breweries in more than 70 countries. It produces 348 international, regional, local and speciality beers and ciders and employs approximately 85,000 people.

With an annual beer production of 24.14 billion litres in 2019, and global revenues of 23.894 billion euro in 2019, Heineken N.V. is the number one brewer in Europe and one of the largest brewers by volume in the world. Heineken's Dutch breweries are located in Zoeterwoude, 's-Hertogenbosch and Wijlre. The original brewery in Amsterdam, closed in 1988, is preserved as a museum called Heineken Experience.

Since the merger between the two largest brewing empires in the world, Anheuser-Busch InBev and SABMiller, in October 2016, Heineken has been the second-largest brewer in the world.

History

Gerard Adriaan Heineken
The Heineken company was founded in 1864 when the 22-year-old Gerard Adriaan Heineken bought a brewery known as De Hooiberg (the haystack) in Amsterdam. In 1869 Heineken switched to the use of bottom-fermenting yeast. In 1873 the brewery's name changed to Heineken's Bierbrouwerij Maatschappij (HBM), and opened a second brewery in Rotterdam in 1874. In 1886 Dr. H. Elion, a pupil of the French chemist Louis Pasteur, developed the "Heineken A-yeast" in the Heineken laboratory. This yeast is still the key ingredient of Heineken beer.

Henry Pierre Heineken
The founder's son, managed the company from 1917 to 1940, and continued involvement with the company until 1951. During his tenure, Heineken developed techniques to maintain consistent beer quality during large-scale production.

After World War I, the company focused more and more on exports. Three days after Prohibition ended in the United States, the first Heineken shipment landed in New York. From that day on, Heineken has remained one of the most successful imported beer brands in the United States.

Alfred Henry Heineken

Henry Pierre's son, Alfred Henry "Freddy" Heineken, started working at the company in 1940, and in 1971 was appointed Chairman of the Executive Board. He was a powerful force behind Heineken's continued global expansion, and while he retired from the Executive Board in 1989, he maintained involvement with the company until his death in 2002.

During this period, Heineken tried to increase its stock price by purchasing competing breweries and closing them down. After World War II, many small breweries were bought or closed. In 1968 Heineken merged with its biggest competitor, Amstel, and in 1975 opened a new brewery in Zoeterwoude. The Amstel brewery was closed in 1980, and its production moved to Zoeterwoude and Den Bosch.

Present
With the part acquisition of Scottish and Newcastle in 2007/2008 Heineken became the third-largest brewer based on revenues, behind the Belgian-Brazilian AB InBev and the British-South African SAB.

Since the merger between Anheuser-Busch InBev and SABMiller in October 2016, Heineken became the second largest brewer in the world.

On 12 January 2010, Heineken International successfully bought the brewery division of Mexican giant FEMSA in all-stock deal expanding its reach throughout Latin America.  The deal brought brands such as Dos Equis XX, Bohemia and Sol under Heineken ownership. Thru the deal, Heineken also started selling its products in Latin America through FEMSA's distribution network. The deal made FEMSA 20% owner of Heineken N.V. essentially becoming its largest single shareholder after the Dutch families (Heineken family and Hoyer family) who owns 25.83% and public shareholders owning 54.17%.

The FEMSA acquisition is expected to keep Heineken in its strong position by growing its market share in the Latin American markets. FEMSA has a massive distribution network and owns Mexico's largest convenience store chain OXXO, which has thousands of locations throughout the country.

In September 2014, it was announced that Heineken would sell its Mexican packaging business Empaque to Crown for around $1.23 billion. Also during that month, Heineken revealed it was in talks to sell its Czech operations to Molson Coors.

On 10 September 2015, Heineken International announced it would acquire a 50% stake in Lagunitas Brewing Company of Petaluma, California as part of an effort to allow Lagunitas to expand its operations globally. As part of the deal Lagunitas will no longer be considered a craft brewer as the Heineken stake is greater than 25%.

In January 2017, Heineken announced it was in negotiations to buy the Kirin Company's 12 breweries in Brazil. The following month, Heineken closed the deal and bought Brasil Kirin for US$700 million.

After previously acquiring 50% of Lagunitas Brewing Company, Heineken announced, on 4 May 2017, it would be purchasing the remaining 50%—making it the sole owner of Lagunitas.

In June 2018, Heineken named Maggie Timoney as the CEO of Heineken USA, making her the first woman to become the CEO of a major United States beer supplier.

In 2018, Heineken signed an agreement with China Resources Enterprises to purchase a 40% stake into the company.

Global structure
Heineken organises the company into five territories which are then divided into regional operations. The regions are: Western Europe, Central and Eastern Europe, The Americas, Africa and the Middle East, and Asia Pacific. These territories contain 115 brewing plants in more than 65 countries, brewing local brands in addition to the Heineken brand.

Executive team 
The executive team of the company consists of the following people:
 Dolf van den Brink, Chairman Executive Board/CEO
 Harold van der Broek, Member Executive Board/CFO
 Marc Busain, President Americas
 Jacco van der Linden, President Asia Pacific
 Chris Van Steenbergen, Chief Human Resources Officer
 Marc Gross, Chief Supply Chain Officer
 Jan Derck van Karnebeek, Chief Commercial Officer
 Roland Pirmez, President Africa, Middle East and Eastern Europe
 Blanca Juti, Chief Corporate Relations Officer
 Soren Hagh, President Europe

Brewing plants
Heineken's brewing plants have been designed and engineered in 4 main parts of the world.

Africa and the Middle East
Heineken has 17 operating companies in Africa and the Middle East.
These include:
 Brasseries du Maroc, Morocco
 Al Ahram Beverages Company, Egypt
 Amstel Brewery, Jordan
 Harar Brewery, Ethiopia
 Bralirwa, Rwanda
 Brarudi, Burundi
 Brasserie Almaza, Lebanon
 Brasseries de Bourbon, Réunion
 Bralima, Democratic Republic of the Congo
 Consolidated Breweries, Nigeria
 Groupe Castel Algérie, Algeria
 Nigerian Breweries, Nigeria
 Société nouvelles des Brasseries SONOBRA, Tunisia
 Sierra Leone Brewery Limited, Sierra Leone
 Sedibeng Brewery, South Africa
 Tango Brewery, Algeria

Asia Pacific

Breweries in Asia Pacific:
 Cambodia Brewery Ltd (CBL) in Cambodia
 Shanghai Asia Pacific Brewery in China
 Hainan Asia Pacific Brewery Company Ltd in China
 Guangzhou Asia Pacific Brewery in China (under construction)
 Multi Bintang Indonesia in Indonesia
 Lao Asia Pacific Brewery in Laos
 Sungai Way Brewery in Malaysia
 DB Breweries in New Zealand
 South Pacific Brewery Ltd (SPB) in Papua New Guinea
 Asia Pacific Breweries in Singapore
 Asia Pacific Brewery Lanka Limited (APB Lanka) in Sri Lanka
 Thai Asia Pacific Brewery in Thailand
 Heineken Vietnam Brewery Co Ltd in Vietnam
 Heineken Hanoi Brewery Co Ltd in Vietnam
United Breweries Ltd Bangalore in India

Europe

Breweries in Europe:
 Brau Union Österreich in Austria
 Syabar Brewing Company in Belarus
 Alken-Maes in Belgium
 Zagorka Brewery in Bulgaria
 Karlovačka pivovara in Croatia
 Starobrno in the Czech Republic
 Federation Breweries in Gateshead, England (closed 2010)
 H. P. Bulmer in Hereford in England
 John Smith's in Tadcaster, England
 Royal Brewery in Manchester, England
 Heineken France:
 Brasserie de l'Espérance in Schiltigheim
 Brasserie Pelforth in Mons-en-Baroeul
 Brasserie de la Valentine in Marseille
 Brasserie Fischer in Schiltigheim (closed 2009)
 Brasserie Adelshoffen in Schiltigheim (closed 2000)
 Brasserie Mutzig in Mutzig (closed 1989)
 Athenian Brewery in Greece
 Heineken Hungária in Hungary
 Heineken Ireland at Lady's Well Brewery in Cork, Ireland
 Heineken Italia in Italy
 Heineken Nederland in the Netherlands
 Żywiec Brewery in Poland
 Central de Cervejas in Portugal
 Heineken Romania in Romania
 Heineken Brewery LLC in Russia
 Heineken Srbija in Serbia
 Caledonian Brewery, Edinburgh, Scotland
 Heineken Slovensko in Slovakia
 Heineken España in Spain, with breweries in Seville, Valencia, Jaén and Madrid
 Heineken Switzerland in Switzerland
 Calanda Bräu in Switzerland
 Pivovarna Laško Union in Slovenia

The Americas

Breweries in the Americas:
 Brasserie Nationale d'Haiti in Haiti
 Commonwealth Brewery in the Bahamas
 Cervejarias Kaiser in Brazil
 Cervecería Cuauhtémoc Moctezuma in Mexico
 Cervecerías Barú-Panama, S.A. in Panama
 Desnoes & Geddes in Jamaica
 Lagunitas Brewing Company in the United States
 Windward & Leeward Brewery in Saint Lucia
 Surinaamse Brouwerij in Suriname

On 20 January 2017, Heineken NV and Kirin Holdings confirmed they were in negotiations for Heineken to acquire Kirin's beer operations in Brazil. Kirin had earlier bought assets in Brazil in 2011 with the local brewer Schincariol, which makes Nova Schin and Baden Baden.

Beer brands

Heineken International owns a worldwide portfolio of over 170 beer brands, mainly pale lager, though some other beer styles are produced. The two largest brands are Heineken and Amstel; though the portfolio includes Cruzcampo, Affligem, Żywiec, Starobrno, Tiger Beer, Zagorka, Red Stripe, and Birra Moretti. Heineken has added a cider blend named Jillz to their list of brands.  Since mid-2007, Heineken has also taken ownership of former S&N International brands such as Strongbow and Bulmers Ciders and John Smith's and Newcastle Brown Ale. Heineken owns the Czech brand Dačický, which was brewed in Kutná Hora from 1573 until Heineken took ownership of it, and closed the brewery. In 2010, Heineken bought Mexican brewery FEMSA Cerveza, including brands Tecate, Sol, Dos Equis, Indio and Kloster.

Ownership 
The shares of Heineken International are traded on the NYSE Euronext Amsterdam and OTCQX under the symbols: HEIA and HEINY respectively. As at 31 December 2013, the shareholding in the group's stock was as depicted in the table below:

 Heineken Holding N.V is a public company listed on the NYSE Euronext Amsterdam. Its single investment is Heineken International. It is majority owned by L’Arche Green N.V an investment vehicle of the Heineken family and the Hoyer family.
 Fomento Económico Mexicano, S.A.B. de C.V (FEMSA) holds an additional 14.935% in Heineken Holding N.V bringing the total direct and indirect shareholding in Heineken International to 20%.

Marketing

Advertising
Heineken's main advertising slogan in the UK was "Refreshes the parts other beers cannot reach", some of which featured voice-over narration by Danish comedian/pianist Victor Borge. The British TV campaign ran for over 30 years – stopping in 2005. From March 2011 they have been advertising using the song 'The Golden Age' by The Asteroids Galaxy Tour. After the success of The Entrance, a web advert (4M views in YouTube), Heineken launched The Date in May 2011.

In March 2017 in Amsterdam, Heineken opened a pop-up bakery for five days to promote the yeast used in its brewing. The bread was made by Mark Plaating and proceeds were donated to a local baking guild.

Sponsorships

Heineken sponsors several sporting events. The Heineken Cup was an annual rugby union knock-out competition involving leading club, regional and provincial teams from the Six Nations: England, France, Scotland, Wales, Ireland, and Italy. Heineken was the title sponsor from the cup's inaugural tournament in 1995–96, until the tournament ceased in 2014 and was replaced by the Champions Cup. Heineken continued its sponsorship of European Club Rugby as the principle partner of the European Rugby Champions Cup returning to title sponsorship of the Champions Cup from 2018–19. They have been credited as the Founding Partner of European Rugby.

Heineken has been an integral partner of the UEFA Champions League since 2005, with a theme of "Enjoyed together around the world." The Heineken Open (tennis) is a tennis tournament on the ATP International Series played in Auckland, New Zealand. Heineken also sponsors the music events: the Heineken Open'er Festival, a contemporary music festival held in Poland; and, since 2004, the Oxegen music festival in Ireland. Heineken sponsors the Ballyheigue Summerfest in County Kerry, Ireland. In 2016, Heineken became the Official Beer of the Formula One World Championship after the Canadian Grand Prix. During the knockout stage of the 2019–20 season, Heineken 0,0% became the official beer of the UEFA Europa League as the season resumed followed with the start of the 2020–21 season.

Holland Heineken House
Since 1992 Heineken organises, together with NOC*NSF, the Dutch meeting place at all the Olympic Games, called the Holland Heineken House.

Heineken Experience

The Heineken Experience is a museum about Heineken Pilsener and the Heineken brewery, based in the original brewery in Amsterdam. The original building was built in 1867, and was in use as a brewery until 1988. In 1991, when part of the establishment was torn down, the Heineken Reception and Information Centre was opened in the remaining building. In 2001 the name was changed to Heineken Experience.

The museum features "rides", interactive exhibits, and two bars. It also gives an insight into the company's history and brewing processes through the years. Visitors receive one small tasting glass and two full-sized glasses of Heineken beer to drink at the end of the tour, both paid for by the 21 euro entry fee.

Controversies

Price fixing
On 18 April 2007 the European commission fined Heineken  €219.3m, Grolsch €31.65m and Bavaria  €22.85m for operating a price fixing cartel in the Netherlands, totalling €273.7m. InBev, (formerly Interbrew), escaped without a penalty because it provided "decisive information" about the cartel which operated between 1996 and 1999 and others in the EU market. The brewers controlled 95% of the Dutch market, with Heineken claiming a half and the three others 15% each.

Neelie Kroes said she was "very disappointed" that the collusion took place at the very highest (boardroom) level. She added, Heineken, Grolsch, Bavaria and InBev tried to cover their tracks by using code names and abbreviations for secret meetings to carve up the market for beer sold to supermarkets, hotels, restaurants and cafes. The price fixing extended to cheaper own-brand labels and rebates for bars.

In 2004 Heineken and Kronenbourg (then part of Scottish and Newcastle), the two dominant brewers in France, were fined €2.5m – with the penalty reduced for co-operating.

New investments in Russia
At the end of March 2022, over a month after Russia started its war in Ukraine, Heineken announced that it was leaving Russia (including with its other brands there, like Affligem, Amstel etc.), saying that ownership of the Russian subsidiary was no longer “durable or viable.” But despite this promise Heineken hired more than 240 new staff and launched no less than 61 new products on the Russian market last year, investigators from Follow the Money reported, based on an overview of 2022 by Heineken Russia. The Dutch brewer’s Russian subsidiary looked back on “a turbulent year, with many new growth opportunities.” One of these opportunities being the departure of Coca-Cola and Pepsi from Russia, which Heineken "cynically" used to "enter the non-alcoholic carbonated beverage market". Heineken announced even more investments for 2023, including more modern packaging and new flavors. New products launched in Russia included an Irish stout, replacing Guinness (which had been brewed and sold by Heineken, under licence), after Diageo withdrew from Russia.

Fake craft beers
In Ireland, Heineken briefly marketed "Blasket Blonde" in County Kerry from March 2015 to September 2016, and Beanntraí Bru in parts of County Cork in August 2016, as locally-made craft beers, from invented breweries.

Possible ties to the slave trade
On 15 February 1864, Gerard Adriaan Heineken bought De Hooiberg (the Haystack) brewery in Amsterdam. It remains unclear whether the funds for the purchase of the Haystack came from his father, a cheese trader, or his mother, whose estate included proceeds from her previous husband’s family’s historical investments in West Indies slave plantations.

In a letter to his mother 18 June 1863, Gerard discussed the potential Haystack purchase and his plans for the future. Gerard’s mother, Anna Geertruida van de Paauw, came to own shares in slave plantations in Berbice (modern day Guyana) and Suriname through her first marriage in 1829 to Pieter Jacob Schumacher van Oudorp (1804–1833) who died in 1833. The Schumacher family owned several plantations in Berbice and Suriname, according to records held at the UK’s National Archive. After Pieter Schumacher died, Anna was remarried to Cornelis Heineken and had four children, one of which was Gerard Heineken. Anna died in 1881.

See also

References

External links

 

 
Breweries in the Netherlands
Multinational companies headquartered in the Netherlands
Companies established in 1864
Price fixing convictions
Multinational breweries
1864 establishments in the Netherlands
Dutch brands
Companies listed on Euronext Amsterdam
Manufacturing companies established in 1864
Beer brands of Netherlands